The Daily Barometer is an independent campus newspaper of Oregon State University, in Corvallis, Oregon. It is published weekly during the fall, winter, and spring quarters, and monthly during the summer.

Also known as The Baro, the news team covers local news and events and brings awareness to important student issues. Students serve as editors, reporters, and photographers to cover news through the newspaper, website, social media, and online videos.

History
In 1896, the College Barometer was founded as a monthly magazine for literature. The format changed to a weekly paper in 1906, a semi-weekly in 1909 and in 1922 became a daily paper, publishing five times per week. In 2016, The Daily Barometer began printing weekly as The Baro, with daily news content delivered via videos and online content.

Notable alumni 
 David Gilkey - photojournalist
 Lindsay Schnell - USA Today reporter
 Nick Lilja - NBC/ABC meteorologist

Awards and honors

College Media Association

David L. Adams Apple Awards
2017
Best Newspaper (4-year, more than 10,000) — First Place
Best News Delivery — First Place
Best Tweet — First Place
Best Facebook Page — Third Place

Associated Collegiate Press

National Pacemaker Awards
2017

Individual Awards
2014
Story of the Year (Editorial/Commentary) — First Place: Editorial Staff, "Hey, NCAA: Southpaw's not an outlaw"
2013
Story of the Year (Feature Story)—National Finalist: Warner Strausbaugh, "What I cherish is my strength"
Photo Excellence (General News Photo)—Fifth Place: Vinay Bikkina

Society of Professional Journalists

National Mark of Excellence Awards
2016
Best Sports Column Writing - Brian Rathbone
2014
Best All-Around Daily Student Newspaper-Regional Winner
2011
Best All-Around Daily Student Newspaper-Regional Winner
2010
Sports Photography-National Finalist: Jeffrey Basinger "Just a Little Hurling" 
2006
Sports Photography—National Winner: Peter Strong “Beavers bring home national title from Omaha”
2005
Editorial Cartooning—National Finalist: Albert Pineda
Breaking News Reporting—National Finalist: Dan Traylor, "Continuing coverage of missing woman" 
2002
Best All-Around Daily Student Newspaper—Second Place Nationally (tie)
2001
Best All-Around Daily Student Newspaper—National Winner
Feature Writing—National Winner: "Five Hearts" series, Matthew D. LaPlante

Region 10 Mark of Excellence Awards 
2017
Best All-Around Daily Student Newspaper
General News Photography - Zbigniew Sikora
Photo Illustration - Zbigniew Sikora
Online/Digital News Videography
2016
Best All-Around Daily Student Newspaper (Finalist)
Best Sports Column Writing - Brian Rathbone
Best Editorial Writing (Finalist)
Best Sports Photography (Finalist) - Zbigniew Sikora
Best General News Reporting (Finalist) - Ellie Magnuson, Amy Schwartz, Lauren Sluss

Oregon Newspaper Publishers Association
2008 - Best Columnist: Nick Lilja 
2010 - Best Photography: Jeffrey Basinger
2014 - Best Special Section: Staff
2014 - Best Editorial: Staff 
2014 - Best Review: Shelly Lorts 
2014 - Best Sports Photo: Neil Abrew 
2014 - Best Photography: Jackie Seus 
2014 - Best Cartooning: Ryan Mason 
2015 - Best Sports Story: Josh Worden 
2015 - Best Cartoonist: Ryan Mason
2015 - General Excellence: Staff

External links
 Official website

References

Oregon State University
1896 establishments in Oregon
Oregon Newspaper Publishers Association
Publications established in 1896
Student newspapers published in Oregon